The Point of Sleat Lighthouse is a lighthouse on Skye in the Inner Hebrides, Scotland.  It was built in 1934 at the Point of Sleat at the southern end of the island.  In 2003 the tower was dismantled and replaced by a concrete structure with a solar powered light.

See also

 List of lighthouses in Scotland
 List of Northern Lighthouse Board lighthouses

References

Lighthouses in the Isle of Skye